In applied mathematics, Raviart–Thomas basis functions are vector basis functions used in finite element and boundary element methods. They are regularly used as basis functions when working in electromagnetics. They are sometimes called Rao-Wilton-Glisson basis functions.

The space  spanned by the Raviart–Thomas basis functions of order  is the smallest polynomial space such that the divergence maps  onto , the space of piecewise polynomials of order .

Order 0 Raviart-Thomas Basis Functions in 2D
In two-dimensional space, the lowest order Raviart Thomas space, has degrees of freedom on the edges of the elements of the finite element mesh. The th edge has an associated basis function defined by

Sometimes the basis functions are alternatively defined as

with the length factor not included.

References

Finite element method
Numerical differential equations
Partial differential equations